Ahmad Hoseyn (also Romanized as Aḩmad Ḩoseyn and Ahmad Hosein; also known as Ahmadasīn, Aḩmad Ḩosey, and Aḩmadsīn) is a village in Hayat Davud Rural District, in the Central District of Ganaveh County, Bushehr Province, Iran. At the 2006 census, its population was 51, in 20 families.

References 

Populated places in Ganaveh County